A masha is a traditional Indian unit of mass, now standardized as .

Grain is usually taken is rice 
8 grains of rice = 1 Ratti 
8 Ratti =  1 Masha 
12 Masha = 1 Tola 
5 Tola  = 1 chatank 
16 chatank = 1 Saer (kg)  1 saer =1000 gram and 40 saer = 1 mann (now a day says 40 kg= 1mann)
25 Mann = 1 Ton (1000 KG)  
Before "rice" is "khas khas"that is poppyseed. It is "8 khaskhas = 1 chawal(rice) "

Units of mass
Customary units in India